Laurent Guétal, also known as the Abbé Guétal (12 December 1841, Vienne - 18 February 1892, Grenoble) was a French landscape painter and Catholic priest.

Life and work 
He was ordained a priest in 1862, and spent much of his life at the Petit Séminaire of Rondeau, near Grenoble. Most of his works were painted in that vicinity.

His primary stylistic influence came from Jean Achard, but he eventually adopted a more purely realistic approach.

He was a regular exhibitor at the Salon in Paris, from 1882 to 1889. One of his best known works, depicting the Lac de l'Eychauda, received an award there in 1886, and was chosen to be displayed at the Exposition Universelle (1889). It is currently held at the Musée de Grenoble.

He is interred at the Saint Roch Cemetery. The largest number of his works may be seen at the Musée de Grenoble.

References

Further reading 
 Georges Lafenestre, "Le Salon de 1889", in: Revue des Deux Mondes. Online @ French WikiSource
 Valérie Huss (Ed.), Grenoble et ses artistes au xixe siècle, Musée de Grenoble, exhibition catalog, 2020 
 Guy Tosatto (Ed.), Trois maîtres du paysage dauphinois au xixe siècle: Jean Achard, Laurent Guétal et Charles Bertier, exhibition catalog, Musée de Grenoble, 2005-2006, éditions Artlys

External links 

 Works by Guétal @ the Base Joconde
 More works by Guétal @ ArtNet

1841 births
1892 deaths
19th-century French painters
French landscape painters
19th-century French Roman Catholic priests
People from Vienne, Isère